Sefhare is a Botswana village located in the Central district.  According to the 2011 census, the village has 5295 inhabitants.

Location 
In the territory of the village there are the following 19 locations:

 Booke of 2 inhabitants,
 Borotsi of 7 inhabitants,
 Dikamakama of 5 inhabitants,
 Ditshoswane with 136 inhabitants,
 Lelotong ,
 Lenganeng of 1 inhabitant,
 Letloreng of 411 inhabitants,
 Letsiara Farm ,
 Lwale of 13 inhabitants,
 Mafoloso of 6 inhabitants,
 Makobeng of 22 inhabitants,
 Marulamantsi
 Marotse of 16 inhabitants,
 Mokoloboto of 43 inhabitants,
 Morobisi ,
 Motlhaba ,
 Murukutshwane of 12 inhabitants,
 Newclear of 3 inhabitants,
 Rabalang of 6 inhabitants,
 Tswerelamakabi of 10 inhabitantsee

References 

Populated places in Botswana